Vansbrosimningen or Vansbrosimmet is an annual open water swimming competition held in July in Vansbro, Dalarna, Sweden since 1950. The distance is 3,000 m, first 2,000 m in Vanån then 1,000 m in Västerdal River. It is part of En svensk klassiker, the "Swedish Classic" which also includes crosscountry skiing (Vasaloppet, 90 kilometers), biking (Vätternrundan, 300 kilometers) and running (Lidingöloppet, 30 kilometers).

Winners

Men
No winners were selected the years 1950-1955.

External links
Official Website

Recurring sporting events established in 1950
Open water swimming competitions
1950 establishments in Sweden
Swedish Classic Circuit
Swimming competitions in Sweden
Sport in Dalarna County
July sporting events